Language Made Plain by Anthony Burgess is a brief overview of the field of linguistics.

Contents of Book
Without dealing specifically with any one language, it provides an introduction to semantics, phonetics, and the development of language.

Later Book
Burgess later incorporated most of Language Made Plain into the first half of the book A Mouthful of Air.

References

Books by Anthony Burgess
Books in semantics
Phonetics works